Steve P. Martins (born April 13, 1972) is a Canadian former professional ice hockey player who played in the National Hockey League (NHL).

Biography
As a youth, Martins played in the 1986 Quebec International Pee-Wee Hockey Tournament with a minor ice hockey team from Gatineau, Quebec. He attended Choate Rosemary Hall, and later attended Harvard University, graduating in 1995.

Martins was drafted in the 1994 NHL Supplemental Draft by the Hartford Whalers. Martins played professional hockey from 1995 until 2009 primarily in minor leagues. He played 267 NHL games with the Hartford Whalers, Carolina Hurricanes, Tampa Bay Lightning, New York Islanders, St. Louis Blues, and the Ottawa Senators. Martins' best season in the NHL was 1999–2000 with the Tampa Bay Lightning, recording 5 goals and 17 assists in 57 games. In his career, he scored 21 goals and 25 assists. 

His best minor league season was 2005–06 with the Binghamton Senators when he recorded 22 goals and 58 assists. He finished his career with the Chicago Wolves in 2008–09.

Career statistics

Awards and honors

References

External links

1972 births
Living people
Binghamton Senators players
Canadian ice hockey centres
Canadian people of Portuguese descent
Carolina Hurricanes players
Chicago Wolves (IHL) players
Detroit Vipers players
Grand Rapids Griffins players
Hartford Whalers draft picks
Hartford Whalers players
Harvard Crimson men's ice hockey players
Ice hockey people from Gatineau
National Hockey League supplemental draft picks
New York Islanders players
Ottawa Senators players
St. Louis Blues players
Springfield Falcons players
Tampa Bay Lightning players
Worcester IceCats players
AHCA Division I men's ice hockey All-Americans